"Too Gone Too Long" is a song written by Gene Pistilli, and recorded by American country music artist Randy Travis.  It was released in November 1987 as the third single from his album Always & Forever.  It peaked at number 1 on the Billboard Hot Country Singles & Tracks, becoming his fifth number 1 hit in the United States. It also topped the Canadian RPM country Tracks chart.

Content
After a former love comes crawling back, the narrator tells her that he's got a new love and that she's been gone too long and it's too late to come back home.

Charts
"Too Gone Too Long" spent the week of March 12, 1988 at the top of both country singles chart.

Weekly charts

Year-end charts

References

1987 singles
1987 songs
Randy Travis songs
Song recordings produced by Kyle Lehning
Warner Records singles